Klek is a mountain in municipality of Zavidovići, Bosnia and Herzegovina. Its highest point is 777 meters. From the north of the mountain, there is a river of Krivaja, which in Zavidovići flows to the river of Bosna.

Klek is popular winter destination for local people. Along with clean air and snow, the mountain has a good view of Zavidovići and surrounding places.

See also
List of mountains in Bosnia and Herzegovina

References

Mountains of Bosnia and Herzegovina